The Ryszard Kapuściński Award is a major annual Polish international literary prize, the most important distinction in the genre of literary reportage.

History
The award was founded to celebrate and promote most worthwhile reportage books which touch on important contemporary issues, evoke reflection, and deepen knowledge of the world of other cultures, and thus also about oneself. Intended to honour the legacy of the journalist and writer Ryszard Kapuściński (1932–2007), the award cherishes the honorary patronage of Mrs Alicja Kapuścińska, the wife of the writer. 

Established in January 2010 by the Council of the Capital City of Warsaw, the award takes form of a monetary prize: 100,000 złoty for the author of the best literary reportage of the year and 20,000 PLN to the author of the best translation of the reportage of the year. Past members of the jury have included figures such as Joanna Bator, Maciej Drygas, Olga Stanisławska, Maciej Zaremba, Małgorzata Szejnert, Anders Bodegård, Julia Fiedorczuk, William R. Brand and Piotr Mitzner.

The award should not be confused with two other awards named after Ryszard Kapuściński: the Polish Press Agency Ryszard Kapuściński Award established in 2010 and the Ryszard Kapuściński Translation Award established in 2015.

Winners

See also
Angelus Award
Zbigniew Herbert International Literary Award
Polish literature

References

Non-fiction literary awards
Awards established in 2010
Literary awards honoring writers
Polish literary awards